Jennifer McCormick is an educator and the former Indiana Superintendent of Public Instruction. She defeated the incumbent Glenda Ritz on November 8, 2016. She received 52.97% of the vote to Ritz's 47.03% of the vote. She has created an exploratory committee to run for governor of Indiana in 2024.

Biography
McCormick began her career as a special education teacher. She later worked as a middle school language arts teacher from 1996-2004. Then she became principal of Yorktown Elementary School in 2004. In 2007, she became the assistant superintendent of Yorktown Community schools and served in that position until she was selected as superintendent in 2010. She serves on the boards for Ivy Tech East Central Region, the Indiana Association of School Business Officials, and Delaware County Youth Salutes. In 2014, she was invited to the National Connected Superintendents Summit at the White House in Washington D.C. In June 2021, McCormick announced that she had officially switched from the Republican Party to the Democratic Party.

State Superintendent

Election
McCormick was chosen by the Indiana Republican Party as the nominee for the Superintendent of Public Instruction on June 11, 2016. At her convention speech, McCormick said Indiana must continue to reject national Common Core learning standards. She said "days of reckless testing must end" and that she knows what it takes to recruit the best teachers. McCormick and Ritz had one debate on October 17, 2016 in Fort Wayne, Indiana. McCormick defeated Ritz for the position of Superintendent on November 8, 2016.

Indiana 2016 Superintendent of Public Instruction Election

Tenure

McCormick ran as a Republican candidate for Indiana superintendent of public instruction. She defeated Dawn Wooten and won the Republican nomination at the state party convention on June 11. McCormick defeated incumbent Glenda Ritz in the Indiana superintendent of schools election. The theme of her campaign was to remove politics from education and that the superintendent should again work in tandem with the Department of Education. It also stated including support for improving the current state assessment program and providing teachers with quality tools to enhance instruction. A primary responsibility for the superintendent will be to implement the Every Student Succeeds Act, a federal education law that replaces the No Child Left Behind Act signed into law by President George W. Bush in 2002.

Personal life
Dr. McCormick is married to Trent, a public school science teacher and longtime wrestling coach. They have one son, Cael, who attends The United States Military Academy.

Awards
Outstanding Contributor to Education Award from the Muncie Delaware County Chamber of Commerce
2013: Person of the Year, Yorktown Chamber of Commerce

References

Ball State University alumni
Educators from Indiana
American women educators
Indiana Republicans
Indiana State University alumni
Living people
Muncie
Politicians from Indianapolis
Purdue University alumni
Superintendents of Public Instruction of Indiana
Women in Indiana politics
Year of birth missing (living people)
21st-century American women
21st-century American politicians
Indiana Democrats